Alstone is a district of the English town of Cheltenham, in the unparished area of Cheltenham, in the Cheltenham district, in the county of Gloucestershire, England.

Once a distinct village (it was listed in the Domesday Book with two mills on the River Chelt) and later informally called Alstone Spa as the result of the mineral waters there, Alstone was subsumed into the 19th-century expansion of the town of Cheltenham.

External links 
Comprehensive history
Illustrated details

Areas of Cheltenham